Angel Witch are  a British heavy metal band which formed in London in 1976 as part of the new wave of British heavy metal (NWOBHM) movement.

Biography

Formation
The band formed, originally under the name of Lucifer, of guitarist and vocalist Kevin Heybourne, guitarist Rob Downing, drummer Steve Jones, and bassist Barry Clements. Lucifer split and Steve Jones joined Bruce Dickinson to form Speed. The remnants of Lucifer became Angel Witch, with the exceptions of Clements, who was replaced by Kevin Riddles, and Steve Jones, who was replaced by Steve Coleman. The following year Rob Downing left the band.

Limited chart success, brief record deal
Angel Witch's first song to achieve mainstream popularity was "Baphomet", which was included on a compilation titled Metal for Muthas. This song drew a fair amount of attention to the band, and they eventually signed a recording deal with EMI. However, the deal was soon cancelled, due to manager Ken Heybourne refusing to hand Angel Witch over to professional management, and the poor performance of their first single released under the EMI label in 1980, which was entitled "Sweet Danger" and lasted a single week on the UK Singles Chart. This was their only UK chart listing and despite being quite an achievement for a NWOBHM group, spending a single week at No. 75 (the lowest position in the charts) meant they were listed as the 'least successful chart act of all time' in the Guinness Book of Hit Records. This same feat was repeated by fellow NWOBHM group Grand Prix with their Keep On Believing 7" in 1983.

Debut album
In 1980, Bronze Records picked up the band and they soon proceeded to record and release their debut album, self-titled Angel Witch. This album is considered one of the most notable from the new wave of British heavy metal.

Break-ups and re-unions
Subsequent to the album's release, the band's structure began to fall apart. The sacking of Dave Hogg, and Kevin Riddles leaving the band to join Tytan, and despite Heybourne's attempts to continue Angel Witch with other musicians, the end of the band was declared and he joined Deep Machine.
Angel Witch returned to activity on 1982, when Heybourne and two musicians from Deep Machine - namely vocalist Roger Marsden and drummer Ricky Bruce - left to assemble a new Angel Witch line-up together with bassist Jerry Cunningham. This line-up lasted a very short time, as Marsden's voice did not fit the style of the band very well. He was fired from the band and Heybourne assumed the vocals once more.
By 1983, the band had ceased its activities, and Heybourne moved to Blind Fury. In 1984, Angel Witch was once more brought to life, this time with the help of bassist Peter Gordelier (ex-Marquis De Sade), singer Dave Tattum and with Dave Hogg returning to the drums. This line-up recorded the album Screamin' N' Bleedin. Dave Hogg was sacked yet again. He was replaced by Spencer Hollman. With the new drummer they recorded Frontal Assault, which deviated heavily from Angel Witch's previous albums, having many melodic elements.

Dave Tattum was released the same year and for a few years Angel Witch played as a trio on sporadic live performances. In 1989, they recorded a new live album, entitled simply Live.

Creation of American group
Heybourne decided that it was in the band's best interest to move to the United States, but the other members had no way of accomplishing that, having stable lives on their home country. Thus, an American incarnation of Angel Witch was born. It was composed of Heybourne, bassist Jon Torres (Lȧȧz Rockit, Ulysses Siren), drummer Tom Hunting (Exodus) and guitarist Doug Piercy (Heathen, Anvil Chorus). This line-up functioned quite well, and soon the band had booked a fair number of shows throughout the US. However, it was found that Heybourne had some pending issues regarding immigration, and he was arrested one day before the first concert of the band. Without Heybourne, Angel Witch was soon dissolved.

New lineup in 2000s and 2010s
After the release of the Resurrection compilation in 2000, the band intended to play together once more, but after a series of internal conflicts, Heybourne assembled yet another line-up, with new members.

They were on the bill for the traditional Orange Goblin Christmas show at The Camden Underworld,  London, on Saturday 20 December 2008.

In 2009, their eponymous song "Angel Witch" was featured on the soundtrack of the action-adventure videogame, Brütal Legend.

In 2011, Angel Witch entered in the studio to record their fourth studio album, entitled As Above, So Below. It was recorded with Kevin Heybourne on guitar and vocals, Will Palmer on the bass guitar, Bill Steer on the guitar, and Andrew Prestidge on the drums. They also returned to playing live, with a second stage headline slot at Bloodstock Open Air in 2011.

One-time Angel Witch bassist Jon Torres died on 3 September 2013 of a reported heart failure.  He was 51 years old.

The band continues to tour and play festivals.

On 30 August 2019, the band released a new single, 'Don't Turn Your Back', which subsequently debuted at number 17 on the Kerrang! Rock Chart before rising to 14 in its second and final week.

Legacy

Angel Witch have been claimed as an influence by many notable metal musicians, including Dave Mustaine (Megadeth) who graced the February 2010 cover of Decibel magazine wearing an Angel Witch shirt, Tom G. Warrior (Celtic Frost), and Chuck Schuldiner (Death).  Bands that have covered Angel Witch songs in concert or on record include Trouble ("Confused" live), Six Feet Under ("Confused" on Graveyard Classics), Blood Curse ("Angel Witch" on their debut album "Sorceress"), Onslaught ("Confused" on In Search of Sanity), Skull Fist ("Angel Witch" live), Battle Ram ("Angel Witch" on the Smash the Gates EP), S.A. Slayer ("Dr. Phibes" & "Angel Witch" live) Exodus ("Angel of Death" on Blood In, Blood Out as bonus track) and Amazing Maze, which is a one off album by Italian Power Metal band Labyrinth under a different name ("Angel Witch").

In 2007, German label Unbroken Records issued a Tribute to Angel Witch compilation album featuring 15 underground metal acts covering songs from the band's early singles and first three full-length releases.

Members

Current members
Kevin Heybourne – lead guitar, lead vocals (1976–1981, 1982–1983, 1984–1990, 1997–1998, 2000–2001, 2002–2003, 2008–present)
Will Palmer – bass (2008–present)
Jimmy Martin – rhythm guitar, backing vocals (2015–present)
Fredrik Jansson – drums (2016–present)

Discography

Studio albums
Angel Witch (1980)
Screamin' 'n' Bleedin' (1985)
Frontal Assault (1986)
As Above, So Below (2012)
Angel of Light (2019)

Live albums
Angel Witch Live (1990)
2000: Live at the LA2 (2000)
Angel of Death: Live at East Anglia Rock Festival (2006)
Burn the White Witch - Live in London (2009)

Compilations
Metal for Muthas (1980)
Doctor Phibes (1986)
Screamin' Assault (1988)
Resurrection (1998)
Sinister History (1999)

Extended plays and singles
"Sweet Danger" (single) (1980)
Sweet Danger (EP) (1980)
"Angel Witch" (single) (1980)	 
"Loser" (single) (1981)
"Goodbye" (single) (1985) 	
They Wouldn't Dare (EP) (2004)
"Don't Turn Your Back" (single) (2019)

See also
List of new wave of British heavy metal bands

References

External links
Angel Witch official Facebook page
Angel Witch - Metal Blade Records artist page
No Class fanzine interview 1981
Angel Witch at NWOBHM.com

English heavy metal musical groups
Musical groups established in 1976
Musical groups disestablished in 1981
Musical groups reestablished in 1982
Musical groups disestablished in 1982
Musical groups reestablished in 1984
Musical groups disestablished in 1998
Musical groups reestablished in 2003
Musical groups disestablished in 2005
Musical groups reestablished in 2008

Musical groups from London
Musical quartets
New Wave of British Heavy Metal musical groups
1976 establishments in England
Bronze Records artists
Metal Blade Records artists
EMI Records artists